Manimuzhakkam is a 1976 Malayalam-language film directed by P. A. Backer and starring  Harikeshan Thampi, Veeran, Johnson, Sankaradi, Saritha, Urmila, Vani, cyril P Jacob, Charulatha, Santhakumari, Sreenivasan and Meena Ganesh. This is the debut film of Sreenivasan. The film was scripted by Backer based on the novel Murippaadukal by Sarah Thomas. It won the National Film Award for Best Feature Film in Malayalam and the Kerala State Film Award for Best Film. The film was shot in black-and-white even though colour films were common during those times (colour cinema became popular in Malayalam cinema only during 1978-1980 and good-quality colour films started being shot frequently only during 1983-1985).

Plot summary 
Jose Paul is a young man brought up in a Roman Catholic orphanage and later transferred to his Hindu ancestral home, where he is subtly persuaded to conform to Hindu religious beliefs. The film chronicles Jose's attempts to establish an identity for himself in a situation full of conflicts.

Cast 
  Harikeshan Thampi
  Veeran
   Cyril P Jacob
  Johnson
  Sankaradi
  Saritha
  Urmila
  Vani
  Charulatha
  Sreenivasan
  Santhakumari
  Meena Ganesh
 Immatty
 Beatrice
 Ponjikkara Kalyani Amma

References

External links 
 
 http://www.malayalachalachithram.com/movie.php?i=687

1970s Malayalam-language films
Films directed by P. A. Backer
Films based on Indian novels
Best Malayalam Feature Film National Film Award winners